Stade Germain Comarmond is a multi-use stadium in Bambous, Rivière Noire District, Mauritius. It is currently used mostly for football and athletics matches. The stadium was built in 2001 and opened in August 2003.  The venue hosted the 2006 African Championships in Athletics. It is currently the home stadium of the Mauritius national under-17 football team, Mauritius national under-20 football team, Petite Rivière Noire SC and Bambous Etoile de L'Ouest Sports Club.

References

Football venues in Mauritius
Athletics (track and field) venues in Mauritius
Bambous, Mauritius